Glencairn is a castle-like mansion in Bryn Athyn, Pennsylvania, that was home to the Pitcairn family for more than 40 years. Now the Glencairn Museum, it contains a collection of about 8,000 artworks, mostly religious in nature, from cultures such as ancient Egypt, ancient Greece, the Roman Empire and medieval Europe, as well as Islamic, Asian, and Native American works. The museum is affiliated with The New Church, and the building is on the National Register of Historic Places.

Mansion

Multi-millionaire businessman Raymond Pitcairn (1885–1966) and his wife, Mildred Glenn (died 1979) built "Glencairn" between 1928 and 1939. Its name was a combination of their surnames. Pitcairn, a member of the New Church himself, had no formal training in architecture and designed the Romanesque-style building using a series of models. The nine-story, granite-and-ruddy-colored-stone mansion features more than 90 rooms on 10 floors. It has three main sections – a central rectangle, and two large rectangular wings – that together measure approximately 175 feet by 135 feet. The exterior features a nine-story tower, carved doorways, pillars, and wall insets. The building also contains elaborate interior mosaics, monel metalwork, Early Medieval stained glass windows, and a replica of the Biblical tabernacle.

The Pitcairn fortune derived from control of Pittsburgh Plate Glass Company, of which his father John Pitcairn, Jr. (1841-1916), was director, 1896–1906. Adjacent to "Glencairn" is Raymond Pitcairn's first architectural success, the Gothic Revival Bryn Athyn Cathedral (1913–19), and his father's house "Cairnwood." The Pitcairns were funders of the American Liberty League.  Following Mildred's death in 1979 (Raymond died in 1966), the mansion, with its collections and Pitcairn archives, was given to the Academy of the New Church.

"Glencairn" was added to the National Register of Historic Places in 1978 and is a contributing property of the Bryn Athyn Historic District.

Glencairn Museum
Guided tours of the building and collection are available year-round. Tours are offered Tuesday through Friday at 2:30pm or by appointment, and weekends at 1:00, 1:45, 2:30 and 3pm. The Museum's first floor, including the Great Hall, Upper Hall, Bird Room, and current temporary exhibition, is open free of charge for self-guided viewing on weekends from 1:00 to 4:30 pm.

Glencairn Museum also offers a variety of events and exhibitions throughout the year.

See also

 National Register of Historic Places listings in Montgomery County, Pennsylvania
 Bryn Athyn College

References

External links

 
 Academy of the New Church Secondary Schools
 Cairnwood Estate
 Bryn Athyn Historic District

Houses on the National Register of Historic Places in Pennsylvania
Swedenborgianism
Museums in Montgomery County, Pennsylvania
Religious museums in Pennsylvania
Houses completed in 1942
Historic district contributing properties in Pennsylvania
Museums of Ancient Near East in the United States
Egyptological collections in the United States
Museums of ancient Greece in the United States
Museums of ancient Rome in the United States
1929 establishments in Pennsylvania
National Register of Historic Places in Montgomery County, Pennsylvania
Bryn Athyn, Pennsylvania
Pitcairn family